The Cove Lake Spillway Dam and Bridge are historic structures in Ozark-St. Francis National Forest, north of Corley, Arkansas. The dam is built of earth and stone, and impounds Cove Lake, location of a recreation area in the national forest. The bridge is a five-span masonry arch structure, built across the dam spillway, where it carries Arkansas Highway 309. The dam and bridge were built in 1937 with funding from the Works Progress Administration, and is a fine example of the Rustic architecture WPA projects were known for.

The structures were listed on the National Register of Historic Places in 1995.

See also
Cove Creek Bridge (Corley, Arkansas)
Cove Creek Bridge (Martinville, Arkansas)
Cove Creek Tributary Bridge
List of bridges documented by the Historic American Engineering Record in Arkansas
List of bridges on the National Register of Historic Places in Arkansas
National Register of Historic Places listings in Logan County, Arkansas

References

External links

Historic American Engineering Record in Arkansas
Road bridges on the National Register of Historic Places in Arkansas
National Register of Historic Places in Logan County, Arkansas
Bridges completed in 1937
Ozark–St. Francis National Forest
Dams on the National Register of Historic Places in Arkansas
Stone arch bridges in the United States
1937 establishments in Arkansas
Rustic architecture in Arkansas
Works Progress Administration in Arkansas
Spillways
Dams completed in 1937